The 1972–73 Algerian Championnat National was the 11th season of the Algerian Championnat National since its establishment in 1962. A total of 16 teams contested the league, with MC Alger as the defending champions.

Team summaries

Promotion and relegation 
Teams promoted from Algerian Division 2 1972-1973 
 WA Boufarik
 USM Sétif
 WA Tlemcen

Teams relegated to Algerian Division 2 1973-1974
 GC Mascara
 CS Cirta
 JS Djijel

League table

References

External links
1972–73 Algerian Championnat National

Algerian Ligue Professionnelle 1 seasons
1972–73 in Algerian football
Algeria